is a Japanese manga artist from Ishikawa Prefecture, Japan. He is notable for the creation of the four-panel comic strip manga Dōjin Work which is the first of his works to be adapted into an anime television series. He also created the four-panel manga series The Comic Artist and His Assistants, which was serialized from 2008 to 2012, with a sequel serialized from August 2013, and adapted into an anime television series which aired in 2014. Hiroyuki has also created dōjinshi based on the Type-Moon visual novels Tsukihime and Fate/stay night. His older sister, is also a manga artist.

Works
Dōjin Work (2004–07)
Super Oresama Love Story
The Comic Artist and His Assistants  (2008–12, 2013–14)
Aho-Girl (2012–17)
Girlfriend, Girlfriend (2020–)

References

External links
Hiroyuki's personal website 

1982 births
Living people
Manga artists from Tokyo
People from Tokyo
People from Nerima